Edward Cullinane Murphy (born 1 June 1934) is a former professional footballer who played in the Football League as a defender.

References
General
 . Retrieved 20 October 2013.
Specific

1934 births
Association football defenders
Bangor City F.C. players
Clyde F.C. players
English Football League players
Living people
Oldham Athletic A.F.C. players
Footballers from Glasgow
Scottish footballers